The 2018 Team Ice Racing World Championship was the 40th edition of the Team World Championship. The final was held on 10 and 11 February, 2018, in Shadrinsk, Russia.

Final Classification

See also 
 2018 Individual Ice Racing World Championship
 2018 Speedway of Nations in classic speedway
 2018 Speedway Grand Prix in classic speedway

References 

Ice speedway competitions
World